Marcus Hill is a bounded rural locality of the City of Greater Geelong local government area on the Bellarine Peninsula, Victoria, Australia to the east of Ocean Grove. As of the 2016 census, Marcus Hill had a population of 159.

History
Marcus Hill Post Office opened on 7 May 1883 and closed in 1978.

References

Towns in Victoria (Australia)
Bellarine Peninsula
Suburbs of Geelong